Nabil Miladi  (born ) is a Tunisian male volleyball player. He was part of the Tunisia men's national volleyball team at the 2014 FIVB Volleyball Men's World Championship in Poland. He played for ES Tunis.

Clubs
 ES Tunis (2014)

References

1988 births
Living people
Tunisian men's volleyball players
Place of birth missing (living people)